Verrijn Stuartweg is an Amsterdam Metro station in Diemen, Netherlands.

References

Amsterdam Metro stations
Diemen
Railway stations opened in 1977